Catherine II may refer to:

Catherine the Great, 1729–1796, empress of Russia
Catherine of Valois (1303–1346), titular empress of Constantinople
Catherine II of Bosnia

See also
Catherine II and opera, about the relation between Catherine the Great and opera
Queen Catherine (disambiguation)